Provo is an unincorporated community and census-designated place (CDP) in Fall River County, in the U.S. state of South Dakota. The population was 10 at the 2020 census.

History
A post office called Provo was established in 1904. The community's name is derived from Bill Provost Sr., an early resident.

References

Unincorporated communities in Fall River County, South Dakota
Unincorporated communities in South Dakota